Manganelli is an Italian surname. Notable people with the surname include:

Antonio Manganelli (1950–2013), Italian police chief
Giorgio Manganelli (1922–1990), Italian journalist, writer, translator and literary critic
Pietro Manganelli, (born 1993) Italian footballer
Roger Manganelli (born 1974), American musician

Italian-language surnames